Anita Durante (28 September 1897 – 2 May 1994) was an Italian actress.

Born Anita Bianchi in Rome into a humble family, after attending a dramatic society for several years Durante made her official debut on stage in 1919, in Ettore Petrolini's Romani de Roma.   Married with the actor Checco Durante, she stayed with the Petrolini's stage company nine years, then she formed a company with her husband. Also active in films, where she is best remembered as the Alberto Sordi's mother in Un americano a Roma, Durante was active on stage until 1992. She died in 1994, aged 96, following an accidental fall from the balcony of her home, while cleaning the windows.

Partial filmography

 Scampolo (1941) - La proprietaria della stireria
 The Last Wagon (1943) - Adele Urbani
 Peddlin' in Society (1946) - Caterina (uncredited)
 Fatalità (1947) - Adele
 Cavalcade of Heroes (1950)
 The Two Sisters (1950) - Agatina
 The Ungrateful Heart (1951) - Anna, padrona della pensione
 Core 'ngrato (1951)
 Viva il cinema! (1952) - Gambalesta's Maid
 Vortice (1953) - La portinaia
 If You Won a Hundred Million (1953) - Pasqua (segment "Il promesso... sposato")
 Angels of Darkness (1954)
 Of Life and Love (1954) - (segment "La Patente")
 Papà Pacifico (1954) - The Porter
 Orient Express (1954)
 Guai ai vinti (1954) - Popolana sulla scala (uncredited)
 An American in Rome (1954) - Madre di Nando
 Il porto della speranza (1954)
 Il vetturale del Moncenisio (1954)
 The Sign of Venus (1955) - Madre di Agnese
 Bella non piangere (1955) - Zia di Nina
 A Hero of Our Times (1955)
 Roman Tales (1955) - La madre di Alvaro
 Cortile (1955) - Geltrude
 Processo all'amore (1955) - Nona Mariani
 The Bigamist (1956) - Amalia
 The Courier of Moncenisio (1956) - Carmela
 Il prezzo della gloria (1956) - Aunt Bettina
 I calunniatori (1956)
 Saranno uomini (1957)
 Ladro lui, ladra lei (1958) - Madre di Cencio
 Adorabili e bugiarde (1958) - The concierge's wife
 Nella città l'inferno (1959) - Assunta
 Policarpo (1959) - Mario Marchetti's Mother
 Genitori in blue-jeans (1960) - The Old Nun (uncredited)
 Carmen di Trastevere (1962) - Landlady of the Bording House (uncredited)
 Adultero lui, adultera lei (1963) - La portinaia
 Mare matto (1963) - Rosario Lo Russo - la madre
 Siamo tutti pomicioni (1963) - Mario's Mother (segment "Le gioie della vita")
 White Voices (1964) - Agnese - Meo's mother
 Made in Italy (1965)
 Why Did I Ever Say Yes Twice? (1969) - (uncredited)
 Er Più – storia d'amore e di coltello (1971) - Mother of Nino
 Colpo grosso... grossissimo... anzi probabile (1972) - Monsignore's mother
 Storia di fifa e di coltello - Er seguito d'er più (1972) - Caterina
 Granada, addio! (1977) - Peppa
 I Hate Blondes (1980)
 Count Tacchia (1982) - Fernanda's Grandmother
 Giovanni Senzapensieri (1986) - Zia Teresa (final film role)

References

External links 
 

1897 births
1994 deaths
Actresses from Rome
Italian film actresses
Italian stage actresses
20th-century Italian actresses
Accidental deaths from falls